Sergio Ortega may refer to:
Sergio Ortega (composer) (1938-2003), Chilean composer
Sergio Ortega (footballer, born 1980), Spanish footballer
Sergio Ortega (footballer, born 1988), Paraguayan footballer
Sergio Ortega (footballer, born 1990), Panamanian footballer